Marshall, Sons & Co. was a British agricultural machinery manufacturer founded in 1848. The company was based in the Britannia Iron Works, Gainsborough, Lincolnshire. Early production was of steam engines and agricultural machinery. Later production included diesel tractors such as the Field Marshall, Track Marshall and former Leyland wheeled tractors.

History
In 1842 William Marshall bought the defunct engineering works of William Garland and Son at Back Street Foundry in Gainsborough. In 1849 he renamed it the Britannia Ironworks and began to produce road steam engines. In 1857 his son James Marshall become a partner and the company name was changed to William Marshall and Son. In 1861 another son, Henry Dickenson Marshall, became a partner. William Marshall died in 1861 and his two sons continued the business. It was incorporated as a limited company in 1862.

Production

Steam engines
Marshall's produced large numbers of steam traction engines, steam rollers, portable engines and agricultural machinery of all types.

Tractors
In 1900 they started designing internal combustion-engined tractors to be called the Colonials, with a power of 16 to 32 hp (not comparable to modern hp) for the export market to replace steam engines, selling 300+ by 1914. In 1928 they started to develop a tractor similar to the Lanz Bulldog from Germany. They launched the 15/30 (Model E) in 1930, followed by the 12/20 which became the Model M in 1938; this then developed into the Field-Marshall in 1944.

Aircraft
In 1917 the company started to build aircraft at a new works built for the purpose on Lea Road in Gainsborough. The works became known as the Carr House works and the company built 150 Bristol F2B two-seat biplane fighters. When the aircraft were completed they were dismantled and towed to West Common in Lincoln to be flown, although some were flown from Layne's Field in Gainsborough.

Merger with Fowler
Marshall, Sons & Co. Ltd. merged with John Fowler & Co., (Leeds) Ltd in 1947 to form Marshall-Fowler Ltd, which eventually became part of the Bentall Simplex industrial group. The Marshall name was revived in the 1980s, initially with the 'Track Marshall' name building large tracked tractors and bulldozers.

Leyland tractors
In 1982 the company bought the production rights to the Leyland tractors range, moving production to Gainsborough and selling them under the Marshall name. Initially successful, the venture failed to generate enough capital to fund the successful development of new models and the company began to lose its market share. A few new, technologically advanced, models were launched but failed to find favour and Marshall was eventually forced to stop production in 1992.
Models included the 502, 602, 604, 702, 704, 802, 804 and 904XL. These were mainly rebadged Leyland tractors. The newer models were the: 132, 100, 115 and 125. Marshall later imported and then rebadged and repainted Steyr tractors from Austria.

Badge engineering
The name was then used as a badge engineering exercise on imported Steyr tractors from Austria, before the marque finally vanished in the mid-1990s. There is now a shopping centre (Marshall's Yard) standing on part of the former Britannia Iron Works site.

Preserved examples
Around 350 of the company’s engines survived into preservation with about 120 of those being traction engines.

Marshall, Sons and Co. built the boiler for the Fairbairn steam crane which stands on the dockside in Bristol. The maker's plate reads "Marshall Sons & Co. Ltd., Engineers, Gainsboro, England, No.92766".

What is thought to be one of the oldest surviving Marshall product, works no. 415, a 2.5nhp portable engine from 1866, may be seen at the Turon Technology Museum (Museum of Power), in New South Wales, Australia. This engine is also the oldest documented portable engine in Australia.

Also in Australia, another Marshall steam engine (No 55721, a 20 hp 2 cylinder model) is still working powering the paddle steamer  on tourist trips along the Murray River in Echuca, Victoria (Australia)

The Pallot Steam Museum at Trinity in Jersey UK has four Marshall models on display, two of them are fully restored to working order which are roadrollers, one large Compound 12 Ton model built in 1922 and another model a smaller Compound 8 Ton made in 1925 the remaining other two are awaiting restoration each, a green 1916 steam roller model and another similar model a 1928 brown one parked in the museum backyard that is awaiting repairs by the museum owner Sam Pallot with his team of engineers and mechanics.

The Weald and Downland Museum in Singleton, West Sussex, England has a  Marshall Threshing Drum  which dates from 1862.

The oldest existing Marshall Traction Engine supplied to the British Market is number 14242, Victoria Empress of India, built in September 1886 and supplied new to Walter Seward of Petersfield, Hampshire, England.

Marshall engine 46583 stands derelict outside at the Gorreana tea plantation on the island of São Miguel in the Azores. Marshall tea processing machinery - some of it still in use - can be found here and also at the nearby Porto Formoso tea plantation.

In Larnaca, Cyprus one portable engine—stamped 1943—stands in public, in a courtyard off King Paul Square (as of  2013).

At Grand Harbour Marina, Birgu, Valletta, Malta, a preserved agricultural engine by Marshalls of unknown date is on display.

See also

Competitors in the agricultural machinery market:
 Ruston & Hornsby
 Ruston, Proctor and Company
 Clayton & Shuttleworth
 William Foster & Co.
 John Fowler & Co. – taken over by Marshall
 Aveling-Barford – Steam roller & road roller builders, later part-merged with Marshalls under British Leyland control.
 Leyland tractors – Later became Marshall Tractors in the old Marshall, Sons & Co. factory

References

External links

History of Marshall, Sons & Co. from Grace's Guide
 Marshall Britannia portable steam engine, 1914 – at the Powerhouse Museum, Sydney, Australia

Defunct manufacturing companies of the United Kingdom
Defunct motor vehicle manufacturers of England
Steam engine manufacturers
Steam road vehicle manufacturers
Tractor manufacturers of the United Kingdom
Companies based in Lincolnshire
Gainsborough, Lincolnshire
British companies established in 1848
Manufacturing companies established in 1848
Manufacturing companies disestablished in 1947
Vehicle manufacturing companies disestablished in 1947
1848 establishments in England
1947 disestablishments in England
British companies disestablished in 1947